This list of West Virginia University alumni includes notable people from published sources that previously attended West Virginia University.

Arts and entertainment

 Michael Ammar – world renowned magician; WVU Distinguished Alumni Award winner 2003 
 Emily Calandrelli – American science communicator, host and producer for Netflix's Emily's Wonder Lab and children's STEM science programming block Xploration Station
 Paul Dooley – actor, writer, comedian
 Conchata Ferrell – actress; known for playing Berta the housekeeper on the CBS sitcom Two and a Half Men
 Antoine Fuqua – director of Training Day, Shooter, Replacement Killers; attended, but did not graduate
 Steve Harvey - Emmy-winning host of Family Feud; attended, but did not graduate
 Cheryl Hines – actress, Curb Your Enthusiasm; attended but did not graduate
 Mike Hodge (B.A. in journalism, minor in theater) – actor and actors' labor union executive; former President of SAG-AFTRA New York local
 Taylor Kinney – actor; portrays Lt. Kelly Severide in NBC's drama Chicago Fire; stars in The Other Woman
 Don Knotts – television and movie actor
 Richard Kuranda - theatrical producer and artistic director Eugene O’Neill Theater Center, Signature Theater, NYC, Raue Center for the Arts
 Billy Mays – television advertiser featured on Discovery Channel's PitchMen and known for promoting several as seen on TV products; attended but did not graduate; died in 2009
 Kathleen Noone – portrays Edna Wallace on the NBC soap opera Passions; known to have attended
 Ben Reed – actor; played quarterback for the West Virginia University football team
 John A. Russo – screenwriter and film director; co-wrote Night of the Living Dead
 Chris Sarandon – television and movie actor, voice of Jack Skellington
 David Selby – Actor

Athletics

 Joe Alexander – American-Israeli current professional basketball player for Maccabi Tel Aviv
 Michael Baker – football player
 Terry Bowden – Yahoo sports analyst
 Tommy Bowden – former head football coach for Clemson University and Tulane University
 John Browning – former NFL defensive tackle for the Kansas City Chiefs
 Marc Bulger – former NFL quarterback for the St. Louis Rams, New Orleans Saints, and Baltimore Ravens
 Da'Sean Butler (born 1987) – basketball player for Hapoel Be'er Sheva of the Israeli Premier League
 Niccolò Campriani – Olympic gold and silver medal-winning sport shooter; won gold in the men's 50 metre rifle three positions and Silver in the men's 10 metre air rifle at the 2012 Summer Olympics
 Mike Compton – two-time Super Bowl Champion and former NFL guard for the Detroit Lions, New England Patriots, and Jacksonville Jaguars
 Devin Ebanks – professional basketball player
 James "Clayster" Eubanks – professional Call of Duty player, two-time Call of Duty Championship winner
 D'or Fischer (born 1981) – American-Israeli basketball player in the Israeli National League
 Mike Gansey – former basketball player in the NBA Development League; current assistant general manager of the Cleveland Cavaliers
 Jedd Gyorko – current second baseman for the St.Louis Cardinals
 Major Harris – quarterback for West Virginia University in their 1988 undefeated season
 Sue Haywood – professional mountain bike racer
 Johannes "Joe" Herber – former professional and German international basketball player
 Chris Henry – former NFL wide receiver for the Cincinnati Bengals
 Jeff Hostetler – Super Bowl Champion and former NFL quarterback for the Washington Redskins, Oakland Raiders, and New York Giants; starting quarterback in Super Bowl XXV
 Chuck Howley – former NFL linebacker for the Chicago Bears and Dallas Cowboys, and Super Bowl V MVP
 Sam Huff – former NFL linebacker; inducted into the Pro Football Hall of Fame in 1982
 Bob Huggins – current head coach of the West Virginia University men's basketball team and former West Virginia University basketball player
 Rodney Clark "Hot Rod" Hundley – former NBA basketball player for the Minneapolis/Los Angeles Lakers; was the first pick in the 1957 NBA draft
 Hal Hunter – football coach
 Bruce Irvin – Super Bowl Champion and current NFL linebacker for the Seattle Seahawks
 James Jett – Olympic gold medal-winning sprinter and former NFL wide receiver for Los Angeles/Oakland Raiders
 Adam "Pacman" Jones – NFL cornerback, currently a free-agent
 Greg Jones – three-time NCAA Division 1 wrestling champion, 2005 Most Outstanding Wrestler award winner, former Associate Head Coach for the West Virginia University wrestling team, current Blackzilians wrestling coach
 Brian Jozwiak – former NFL offensive lineman for the Kansas City Chiefs
 Ken Kendrick – owner of the Arizona Diamondbacks of Major League Baseball
 Steve Kline – former Major League Baseball pitcher
 Ellis Lankster – current NFL cornerback for the New York Jets
 Oliver Luck – former NFL quarterback, athletic director of West Virginia University, First Commissioner of the XFL,  president/general manager of the Houston Dynamo, father of Andrew Luck
 Billy Joe Mantooth – former NFL linebacker for the Houston Oilers
 Pat McAfee – former NFL punter for the Indianapolis Colts
Casey Mitchell (born 1988) – basketball player for Elitzur Ashkelon of the Israeli Basketball Premier League
 Dan Mozes – 2006 Rimington Trophy winner
 Adrian Murrell – former running back for New York Jets
 Solomon Page – former NFL offensive lineman for the Dallas Cowboys and San Diego Chargers
 Tarik Phillip (born 1993) – British-American basketball player in the Israel Basketball Premier League
 Kevin Pittsnogle – former basketball player in the NBA Development League
Adrian Pledger (born 1976) – basketball player
 Jerry Porter – former NFL wide receiver for the Oakland Raiders and Jacksonville Jaguars
 Wil Robinson – former ABA basketball player; All-American at West Virginia
 Rich Rodriguez – former head football coach of the University of Michigan; current head football coach of the University of Arizona
 Todd Sauerbrun – former All-Pro NFL punter (five different teams)
 Owen Schmitt – former NFL fullback for the Seattle Seahawks, Philadelphia Eagles, and Oakland Raiders
 Floyd B. "Ben" Schwartzwalder – former head coach of the 1959 National Championship Syracuse University football team
Heath Slater – professional wrestler, former wrestler at WVU
 Steve Slaton – former NFL running back for the Houston Texans and Miami Dolphins; current CFL running back for the Toronto Argonauts
 Dave Stephenson – former NFL guard for the Los Angeles Rams and Green Bay Packers
 Darryl Talley – West Virginia University all-time team member and former NFL Linebacker for the Buffalo Bills
 Rod Thorn – former NBA and ABA basketball player and current President of Basketball Operation for the NBA
 John Thornton – former NFL defensive tackle for the Cincinnati Bengals
 Virginia Thrasher – current WVU rifle team member and 2016 Olympic gold medalist in air rifle 
 Mike Vanderjagt – former NFL placekicker for the Indianapolis Colts and Dallas Cowboys
 Jerry West – former NBA basketball player for the Los Angeles Lakers and Hall of Famer; considered one of the greatest NBA and college basketball players of all time and is the image on the logo for the NBA
 Pat White – former NFL quarterback for the Miami Dolphins
 Andrew Wright – current defender/midfielder for Morecambe F.C.
 John Writer – Olympic gold and silver medal-winning sports shooter
 Amos Zereoué – former NFL running back for the Pittsburgh Steelers, Oakland Raiders, and New England Patriots

Authors
 Maggie Anderson – poet
 Allen Appel – writer
 Matt Carson – novelist
 Stephen Coonts – New York Times bestselling author
 Paul Russell Cutright – historian and biologist
 Chip Ingram – Christian writer
 Chuck Kinder – novelist
Mary Marantz - bestselling author
 Ann Pancake – author

Business
 Heather Bresch – CEO of Mylan, Inc.
 John Chambers – President and CEO of Cisco Systems
 Karen S. Evans – de facto CIO of the United States under President George W. Bush
 Richard Wallen - CEO and General Manager of Grant County Public Utility District
 Maggie Hardy Magerko – President of 84 Lumber Company and Nemacolin Woodlands Resort (attended for two years but did not graduate)

Education
 Charles E. Bayless – president of the West Virginia University Institute of Technology
 Todd H. Bullard – former president of Potomac State College and Bethany College
 Joseph DiSarro (Ph.D.) – professor and chair in the Department of Political Science at Washington & Jefferson College
Wanda Franz (Ph.D.) – professor and anti-abortion activist
 Ruqayyah Ahmed Rufa'i – Nigeria's Minister of Education
 Patrick Vaughan – historian and professor at the Jagiellonian University in Kraków, Poland
 Charles M. Vest – President Emeritus of Massachusetts Institute of Technology (MIT)

Journalists
 Frank Kearns – foreign correspondent and broadcast journalist with CBS News 1953–1971;  WVU Professor of Journalism 1971–1983 (died 1986)
 Frank Lovece
 Asra Nomani
 Michael Tomasky — Editor in chief of Democracy (journal), future editor of The New Republic
 Ken Ward Jr. – reporter for the Charleston Gazette-Mail; 2018 MacArthur Fellow

Military

 Ret. Gen. Earl E. Anderson – Marine Corps General
 Corporal Thomas W. Bennett - A United States Army conscientious objector corporal who served as a combat medic.
 Ret. Gen. Bantz J. Craddock – United States Army, former Supreme Allied Commander Europe
 Brig. Gen. Frank Kendall Everest, Jr – test pilot and pioneer of rocket aircraft
 Gen. Robert H. Foglesong – retired Commander, US Air Force in Europe; former President of Mississippi State University

Music
 Velvet Brown – tuba soloist, music educator
 Jay Chattaway – Star Trek music score writer
 Fuzzy Knight – writer of the WVU Fight Song and country-western actor
 Kathy Mattea – country music singer
 James Valenti – tenor at the Metropolitan Opera, New York
 Little Jimmy Dickens – country music singer
 Scott Krippayne - the singer and composer of the paw patrol theme song

Politics
 Victor A. Arredondo – former Minister of Education at the State of Veracruz, Mexico, 2004-2010
 Carl George Bachmann – United States Congressman, Republican Minority Whip 1931–1933
 Clark S. Barnes – West Virginia Senate, District 15, 2004–present
 Corey Lee Palumbo – West Virginia Senate, District 17, 2009 – present and West Virginia House of Representatives 2003-2009
 William Wallace Barron – 26th Governor of West Virginia
 Irene Berger – United States District Judge for the Southern District of West Virginia
 Frank L. Bowman – politician who represented West Virginia in the United States House of Representatives
 Virginia Mae Brown – first woman to head the Interstate Commerce Commission
 Becky Cain – past president of the League of Women Voters
 William G. Conley – 18th Governor of West Virginia
 William Harrison Courtney – special assistant to President Clinton
 Joseph M. Devine – Governor of North Dakota from 1898 to 1899
 David Ginsburg (1912–2010) – presidential adviser and executive director of the Kerner Commission
 William E. Glasscock – 13th Governor of West Virginia
 Howard Mason Gore – 17th Governor of West Virginia
 Kathleen M. Hawk – Director of the Federal Bureau of Prisons
 Robert Lynn Hogg – represented West Virginia in the United States House of Representatives, 1930–1933
 Brad Hoylman – sitting New York State Senator representing the 27th District which includes Midtown, Times Square, and Greenwich Village of lower Manhattan 
 Nancy Jacobs – Maryland State Senator (1973)
 Sen. Harley M. Kilgore – chairman of the US Senate Subcommittee on War Mobilization during World War II
 Tim Mahoney – United States Congressman from Florida
 Joe Manchin – 34th Governor of West Virginia; United States Senator from West Virginia
 William C. Marland – 24th Governor of West Virginia
 Edward F. McClain – member of the Wisconsin State Assembly
 Darrell McGraw – former West Virginia Attorney General, former Chief Justice of the West Virginia Supreme Court
 Carlos Eduardo Mendoza – United States District Judge for the Middle District of Florida
 M. Blane Michael – Circuit Judge, United States Court of Appeals for the Fourth Circuit
 Alan Mollohan – United States Congressman
 Arch A. Moore, Jr. – 28th and 30th Governor of West Virginia
 Ephraim F. Morgan – 16th Governor of West Virginia
 Matthew M. Neely – 22nd Governor of West Virginia
 Asra Nomani – former Wall Street Journal reporter, author and Islamic reform and feminism activist
 Mike Pantelides – Mayor of Annapolis, Maryland 
 Tom Pridemore – West Virginia House of Delegates and football player
 Jeff Pyle – Pennsylvania State Representative
 Stuart F. Reed – politician who represented West Virginia in the United States House of Representatives
 Nelson Stamler – New Jersey State Senator, Assemblyman, Judge, and Prosecutor
 Virginia Starcher – member of the West Virginia House of Delegates, 1986–1990
 Paul S. Stull – member of the Maryland House of Delegates
 John G. Trueschler – former member of the Maryland House of Delegates (1979)
 Cecil H. Underwood – youngest (25th) and oldest (32nd) Governor of West Virginia

Royalty
 Princess Sarah Culberson – Mende princess and philanthropist

Science
 Ann Bartuska – ecologist and biologist, Senior advisor at Resources for the Future and former Deputy Under Secretary for Research, Education and Economics at United States Department of Agriculture
James M. Bobbitt - chemist and professor at the University of Connecticut
 Frances Harshbarger (1902–1987) – mathematician
 Katherine Johnson – mathematician, NASA computer scientist, recipient of the Presidential Medal of Freedom
 Robert Kerns – psychologist
 Jon McBride – NASA astronaut
 Kim Weaver – astrophysicist
 Emily Calandrelli - science communication- Host, Emily's Wonder Lab, guest host, Bill Nye Saves the World (Netflix); Host and Executive Producer, Xploration Outer Space (Fox); author, Ada Lace children's books introducing science

Other notable alumni
 Cynthia Germanotta – philanthropist, co-founder of Born This Way; also, Lady Gaga's mother.
 Melanne Pennington – 1984 Miss West Virginia
 Patsy Ramsey – mother of JonBenet Ramsey; Miss West Virginia in 1977

References 

West Virginia University alumni